Armeria pungens, common name spiny thrift, is a rare plant of the genus Armeria of the family Plumbaginaceae.

Description
The stems are lignified at the base, robust, highly branched. Flower heads are pale pink, gathered in globose inflorescences at the top of long pedicels. Flowering period extends from May through July.

Distribution
This plant is endemic to Italy (Sardinia), France (Corsica), Portugal and Spain.

Habitat

Synonyms
 Armeria fasciculata var. intermedia Daveau
 Armeria fasciculata var. pungens (Link) Arcang.
 Armeria fasciculata (Vent.) Willd.
 Armeria maritima subsp. pungens (Link) Bernis
 Reverchonia fasciculata (Vent.) Gand.
 Reverchonia pungens (Link) Gand.
 Statice fasciculata var. pungens (Link) Samp.
 Statice fasciculata Vent.

Gallery

References

 Pignatti S. 1982  - Flora d'Italia. Bologna – Vol. II, pag, 301
 Piñeiro R, Fuertes Aguilar J, Munt DD, Nieto Feliner G. -  Atlantic-Mediterranean disjunction in the sand-dune shrub Armeria pungens (Plumbaginaceae) - Real Jardín Botánico de Madrid, CSIC
 Anthos

External links
 
 Schede di Botanica

pungens